Neotaranomis is a genus of beetles in the family Cerambycidae, containing the following species:

 Neotaranomis atropurpurea Chemsak & Noguera, 2001
 Neotaranomis australis Chemsak & Linsley, 1982
 Neotaranomis sinaloae Chemsak & Linsley, 1982

References

Trachyderini
Cerambycidae genera